Steven James Burke  (born 4 March 1988) is a former English track and road cyclist, who rode for the now disbanded  cycling team. He represented Britain at the 2008 Summer Olympics, beating his pre Olympics personal best in the individual pursuit by eleven seconds, to take the bronze medal. He stood on the podium alongside his cycling idol, gold medallist Bradley Wiggins.

During 2012, Burke was part of the Great Britain team that won the Olympic and World Championships, in the Team Pursuit discipline. He was part of the GB Team, that retained the team pursuit title at the 2016 Olympics. Burke was appointed Member of the Order of the British Empire (MBE) in the 2013 New Year Honours on 29 December 2012, for services to cycling.

Early life
Burke was born in Burnley and lived in Colne, Lancashire during his early life, attending Park High School and later Nelson and Colne College (which named its sports centre after him). Born into a cycling family, both Burke’s grandfather Brian Wesson, and his mother Sharon, have competed at national level. His dad Alvin also was a cyclist and competed in many time trials.

He began attending Manchester Velodrome as a teenager, previously being more interested in football.

Career
Despite specialising in the team pursuit, Burke has an impressive turn of speed, demonstrated by his success as a junior in the scratch and kilo events. He was consistently beating Mark Cavendish in sprints, during training in 2007.

Major results

2005
1st  Kilo, British National Track Championships – Junior
3rd 30 km Points race, British National Track Championships – Junior
3rd 20 km Scratch race, British National Track Championships – Junior
1st  Team pursuit, European U23 Track Championships
2nd Team pursuit, Junior World Track Championships

2006
1st  Team pursuit, European U23 Track Championships
3rd Team pursuit, Junior World Track Championships

2007
3rd Team pursuit, Round 4, Manchester, 2006–2007 UCI Track Cycling World Cup Classics
1st  20 km Scratch race, British National Track Championships
1st  Pursuit, British National Track Championships – Junior
1st  Team pursuit, British National Track Championships
1st  Team pursuit, European U23 Track Championships
3rd Pursuit, European U23 Track Championships

2008
3rd  Individual pursuit, Beijing Olympics
1st  Individual pursuit, British National Track Championships
3rd Kilo, British National Track Championships
2009
1st  Individual pursuit, European U23 Track Championships
1st  Kilo, British National Track Championships

2011
1st  Team pursuit, European Track Championships
1st  Individual pursuit, British National Track Championships

2012
1st  Team pursuit, Track Cycling World Championships
1st  Team pursuit, London Olympics

2013
1st  Team pursuit, European Track Championships
2nd Team pursuit, Track Cycling World Championships

2014
2nd  Team pursuit, Commonwealth Games
1st Team pursuit, Round 2, London, 2014–15 UCI Track Cycling World Cup
2nd Team pursuit, Round 1, Guadalajara, 2014–15 UCI Track Cycling World Cup
2nd Individual pursuit, British National Track Championships
2015
1st  Team pursuit European Track Championships
3rd 1km time trial, British National Track Championships
2016
 1st  Team pursuit, Olympic Games

World records

See also
2012 Summer Olympics and Paralympics gold post boxes

References

External links
Motorpoint Pro-Cycling
Steven Burke, articles at Pendletoday.co.uk
British Cycling interview with Steven Burke, 23 July 2006

Living people
1988 births
British male cyclists
English male cyclists
English Olympic medallists
Olympic cyclists of Great Britain
Olympic gold medallists for Great Britain
Olympic bronze medallists for Great Britain
Cyclists at the 2008 Summer Olympics
Cyclists at the 2012 Summer Olympics
Cyclists at the 2016 Summer Olympics
Members of the Order of the British Empire
Sportspeople from Burnley
People from Colne
Olympic medalists in cycling
UCI Track Cycling World Champions (men)
Medalists at the 2012 Summer Olympics
Medalists at the 2008 Summer Olympics
Medalists at the 2016 Summer Olympics
Cyclists at the 2014 Commonwealth Games
Commonwealth Games silver medallists for England
Commonwealth Games medallists in cycling
English track cyclists
Medallists at the 2014 Commonwealth Games